David Svensson (born 14 January 1966) is a Swedish rower. He competed at the 1988 Summer Olympics and the 1992 Summer Olympics.

References

1966 births
Living people
Swedish male rowers
Olympic rowers of Sweden
Rowers at the 1988 Summer Olympics
Rowers at the 1992 Summer Olympics
Place of birth missing (living people)